Dunn Spur is a prominent rock spur which descends from Mount Blackburn and extends for  along the north side of Van Reeth Glacier, in the Queen Maud Mountains of Antarctica. It was mapped by the United States Geological Survey from surveys and from U.S. Navy air photos, 1960–63, and was named by the Advisory Committee on Antarctic Names for Thomas H. Dunn of U.S. Navy Squadron VX-6, an aircrewman on photographic aircraft over Antarctica on Operation Deep Freeze 1964, 1966 and 1967.

References 

Ridges of Marie Byrd Land